Celebrities Undercover is an American reality television series, which premiered on March 18, 2014, on the Oxygen cable network. The half-hour hidden camera series features various celebrities who wear heavy make-up or costumes in order to hide their identity, who later act in different situations to find out what their friends or fans really think about them. The reality show is executive produced and presented by talk show host Wendy Williams.

Episodes

References

External links 

 
 
 

2010s American reality television series
2014 American television series debuts
Oxygen (TV channel) original programming
English-language television shows
American hidden camera television series
2014 American television series endings